West Midlands English is a group of dialects of the English language native to the English West Midlands.

County accents
Certain areas of the West Midlands are stereotyped as having stronger accents than others, Dudley in the Black Country being an example. There are some local phrases in the Black Country that are renowned. People do tend to substitute a reply of "arr" for "yes". Generally, most words are shortened, most commonly being "I haven't" to "I ay" (which can be argued as an even shorter form of "I ain't").
In the south of the West Midlands (southern Warwickshire and Worcestershire), the accent is more similar to the general southern accent.

Dave Bradley, a presenter on BBC Hereford and Worcester said in 2005 that:

Phonology
 West Midlands accents do not have the trap-bath split, so cast is pronounced  rather than the  pronunciation of most southern accents.
 H-dropping is common, in which the  sound is usually omitted from most words. 
 There is no Ng-coalescence. Wells noted that there were no exceptions to this rule in Stoke-on-Trent, whereas there were for other areas with the  pronunciation, such as Liverpool.
 Dialect verbs are used, for example am for are, ay for is not (related to ain't), bay for are not, bin for am or, emphatically, for are. Hence the following joke dialogue about bay windows: "What sort of windas am them?" "They'm bay windas." "Well if they bay windas wot bin them?". There is also humour to be derived from the shop-owner's sign of Mr. "E. A. Wright" (that is, "He ay [isn't] right," a phrase implying someone is saft [soft] in the jed [head]). Saft also may mean silly as in, "Stop bein' so saft".
 The Birmingham and Coventry accents are distinct, even though the cities are only 19 miles/30 km apart. Coventry being closer to an East Midlands accent. 
 Around Stoke-on-Trent, the short i can sometimes sound rather like ee, as very obvious when hearing a local say it, however this is not always the case as most other words such as "miss" or "tip" are still pronounced as normal. The Potteries accent is perhaps the most distinctly 'northern' of the West Midlands accents, given that the urban area around Stoke-on-Trent is close to the Cheshire border.
 Herefordshire and parts of Worcestershire and Shropshire have a rhotic accent  somewhat like the West Country, and in some parts mixing with the Welsh accent, particularly when closer to the English/Welsh border.
 In Warwickshire, the northern towns like Nuneaton and Bedworth have a similar accent to Coventry whereas southern Warwickshire generally have a southern accent.

Varieties of West Midlands English
Black Country
 Brummie (spoken in Birmingham)
 Coventry
 Herefordshire (West Country accent)
 Potteries (North Staffordshire)
 Salopian (Shropshire)
 Warwickshire
 Worcestershire

References

Further reading

External links
Listen to examples of regional accents and dialects from across the UK on the British Library's 'Sounds Familiar' website

British English
Culture in the West Midlands (region)
Dialects of English